The Intellectual Property High Court (Chiteki-zaisan kōtō-saiban-sho), sometimes abbreviated IPHC, is a special branch of Tokyo High Court in the judicial system of Japan. It is based in Nakameguro, a district in Meguro Ward in Tokyo, Japan.

The Intellectual Property (IP) High Court was established on 1 April 2005, in order to  accelerate and reduce the costs of patent litigation in Japan. The IP High Court hears appeals from district courts in Japan on patent actions and suits against appeal/trial decisions made by the Japan Patent Office (JPO). The IP High Court is also the exclusive court of appeals on issues such as: the rights of authors of a computer program, utility model rights, and integrated circuit layout design protection.

References

Further reading
 Katsumi Shinohara, Outline of the Intellectual Property High Court of Japan, AIPPI Journal, May 2005, p. 131.

External links
 

2005 establishments in Japan
Courts and tribunals established in 2005
Intellectual property adjudication bodies
Japanese patent law